The 1980 Washington State Cougars football team was an American football team that represented Washington State University in the Pacific-10 Conference (Pac-10) during the 1980 NCAA Division I-A football season. In their third season under head coach Jim Walden, the Cougars compiled a 4–7 record (3–4 in Pac-10, tied for sixth), and outscored their opponents 287 to 271.

The team's statistical leaders included Samoa Samoa with 1,668 passing yards, Tim Harris with 801 rushing yards, and Jim Whatley with 433 receiving yards.

This year's Apple Cup is the most recent played at Joe Albi Stadium in Spokane; since 1982, the Cougar home games in the series (even-numbered years) have been held on campus at Martin Stadium.

Schedule

Personnel

Season summary

San Jose State

at Tennessee

Army

Pacific

at Arizona State

at Arizona

Stanford

at Oregon

Oregon State

at California

Washington

NFL Draft
Five Cougars were selected in the 1981 NFL Draft.

References

External links
 Old Wazzu – 1981 film short – footage of 1980 Army game (3:40 – 5:30)
 Game program: San Jose State vs. WSU at Spokane – September 13, 1980
 Game program: Army at WSU – September 27, 1980
 Game program: Pacific at WSU – October 4, 1980
 Game program: Stanford at WSU – October 25, 1980
 Game program: Oregon State at WSU – November 8, 1980
 Game program: Washington vs. WSU at Spokane – November 22, 1980

Washington State
Washington State Cougars football seasons
Washington State Cougars football